Raddiella is a genus of Neotropical plants in the grass family native to South America, Panama and Trinidad.

Species
 Raddiella esenbeckii (Steud.) C.E.Calderón ex Soderstr. - Brazil, Bolivia, Colombia, Venezuela, French Guiana, Suriname, Guyana, Trinidad, Panama
 Raddiella kaieteurana Soderstr. - Venezuela (Bolívar), Suriname, Guyana, Brazil (Pará)
 Raddiella lunata Zuloaga & Judz. - Rondônia, Mato Grosso
 Raddiella malmeana (Ekman) Swallen - Pará, Mato Grosso
 Raddiella minima Judz. & Zuloaga - Pará, Mato Grosso
 Raddiella molliculma (Swallen) C.E.Calderón ex Soderstr. - Caquetá
 Raddiella potaroensis Soderstr. - Venezuela (Bolívar), Guyana
 Raddiella vanessiae Judz. - French Guiana

Formerly included
see Parodiolyra 
Raddiella truncata - Parodiolyra lateralis

References

Bambusoideae genera
Grasses of South America
Grasses of Brazil
Flora of northern South America
Bambusoideae